The slave narrative is a type of literary genre involving the (written) autobiographical accounts of enslaved Africans, particularly in the Americas. Over six thousand such narratives are estimated to exist; about 150 narratives were published as separate books or pamphlets. In the United States during the Great Depression (1930s), more than 2,300 additional oral histories on life during slavery were collected by writers sponsored and published by the Works Progress Administration, a New Deal program. Most of the 26 audio-recorded interviews are held by the Library of Congress.

Some of the earliest memoirs of captivity known in the English-speaking world were written by white Europeans and later Americans, captured and sometimes enslaved in North Africa by local Muslims, usually Barbary pirates. These were part of a broad category of "captivity narratives". Beginning in the 17th century, these included accounts by colonists and later American settlers in North America and the United States who were captured and held by Native Americans. Several well-known captivity narratives were published before the American Revolution, and they often followed forms established with the narratives of captivity in North Africa. North African accounts did not continue to compile after the Napoleonic Era; accounts from North Americans, captured by western tribes migrating west continued until the end of the 19th century.

Given the problem of international contemporary slavery in the 20th and 21st centuries, additional slave narratives are being written and published.

As a literary genre 
The development of slave narratives from autobiographical accounts to modern fictional works led to the establishment of slave narratives as a literary genre. This large rubric of this so-called "captivity literature" includes more generally "any account of the life, or a major portion of the life, of a fugitive or former slave, either written or orally related by the slave himself or herself". Whereas the first narratives told the stories of fugitive or freed slaves in a time of racial prejudice, they further developed into retrospective fictional novels and extended their influence until common days. Not only maintaining the memory and capturing the historical truth transmitted in these accounts, but slave narratives were primarily the tool for fugitive or former slaves to state their independence in the 19th century, and carry on and conserve authentic and true historical facts from a first-person perspective. They go further than just autobiographies, and are moreover "a source for reconstructing historical experience". The freed slaves that wrote the narratives are considered as historians, since "memory and history come together". These accounts link elements of the slave's personal life and destiny with key historical phenomena, such as the American Civil War and the Underground Railroad.

In simple, yet powerful storylines, slave narratives follow in general a plot common to all of them: starting from the initial situation, the slave in his master's home, the protagonist escapes in the wilderness and narrates the struggle for survival and recognition throughout his uncertain journey to freedom. After all, these narratives were written retrospectively by freed slaves and/or their abolitionist advocate, hence the focus on the transformation from the dehumanized slave to the self-emancipated free man. This change often entailed literacy as a means to overcome captivity, as the case of Frederick Douglass highlights. The narratives are very graphic to the extent as extensive accounts of e.g. whipping, abuse and rape of enslaved women are exposed in detail (see Treatment of slaves in the United States). The denunciation of the slave owners, in particular their cruelty and hypocrisy, is a recurring theme in slave narratives, and in some examples took a comic stance denouncing the double standards (e.g. in Douglass's narrative, his slave owner Hopkins is a very religious, but also brutal man).

According to James Olney, a typical outline looks the following way:

There is no consensus about what exact type of literature slave narratives are, whether they can be considered as a proper genre, comprised in the large category captivity narrative, or are autobiographies, memoirs, testimonials, or novels; nonetheless, they play a big part in keeping up the memory of slavery and in approaching a topic that was considered as a taboo for a long time – especially since many denied and still deny the existence of slavery. Given the participation in the 19th century of abolitionist editors (at least in the United States), influential early 20th-century historians, such as Ulrich B. Phillips in 1929, suggested that, as a class, "their authenticity was doubtful". These doubts have been criticized following better academic research of these narratives, since the late 20th-century historians have more often validated the accounts of slaves about their own experiences.

North American slave narratives
Slave narratives by African slaves from North America were first published in England in the 18th century. They soon became the main form of African-American literature in the 19th century. Slave narratives were publicized by abolitionists, who sometimes participated as editors, or writers if slaves were not literate. During the first half of the 19th century, the controversy over slavery in the United States led to impassioned literature on both sides of the issue.

To present the reality of slavery, a number of former slaves, such as Harriet Tubman, Harriet Jacobs, and Frederick Douglass, published accounts of their enslavement and their escapes to freedom. Lucy Delaney wrote an account that included the freedom suit waged by her mother in Missouri for their freedom. Eventually some 6,000 former slaves from North America and the Caribbean wrote accounts of their lives, and over 100 book-length accounts were published from formerly enslaved people worldwide.

Before the American Civil War, some authors wrote fictional accounts of slavery to create support for abolitionism. The prime example is Uncle Tom's Cabin (1852) by Harriet Beecher Stowe. The success of her novel and the social tensions of the time brought a response by white Southern writers, such as William Gilmore Simms and Mary Eastman, who published what were called anti-Tom novels. Both kinds of novels were bestsellers in the 1850s.

Tales of religious redemption
From the 1770s to the 1820s, slave narratives generally gave an account of a spiritual journey leading to Christian redemption. The authors usually characterized themselves as Africans rather than slaves, as most were born in Africa.

Examples include:
Ukawsaw Gronniosaw, A Narrative of the Most Remarkable Particulars in the Life of James Albert "Ukawsaw Gronniosaw", an African Prince, Bath, England, 1772
Olaudah Equiano, The Interesting Narrative of the Life of Olaudah Equiano, London, 1789
Venture Smith, A Narrative of the Life and Adventures of Venture, a Native of Africa: But Resident Above Sixty Years in the United States of America, New London, 1798
Jeffrey Brace, The Blind African Slave, Or Memoirs of Boyrereau Brinch, Nicknamed Jeffrey Brace, as told to Benjamin F. Prentiss, Esq., St. Albans, Vermont, 1810; edited and with an introduction by Kari J. Winter, Madison, WI: University of Wisconsin Press, 2004, 
John Jea, The Life, History, and Unparalleled Sufferings of John Jea, the African Preacher, 1811
Greensbury Washington Offley, A Narrative of the Life and Labors of the Rev. G. W. Offley, a Colored Man, Local Preacher and Missionary, 1859

Some more recent narratives, such as Petro Kilekwa's Slave Boy to Priest: The Autobiography of Padre Petro Kilekwa (1937), followed a similar theme.

Tales to inspire the abolitionist movement
From the mid-1820s, writers consciously chose the autobiographical form to generate enthusiasms for the abolitionist movement. Some writers adopted literary techniques, including the use of fictionalized dialogue. Between 1835 and 1865 more than 80 such narratives were published. Recurrent features include: slave auctions, the break-up of families, and frequently two accounts of escapes, one of which is successful. As this was the period of the forced migration of an estimated one million slaves from the Upper South to the Deep South through the internal slave trade, the experiences of auctions and separation of families were common to many.

Examples include:
William Grimes, Life of William Grimes, the Runaway Slave, New York, 1825
Solomon Bayley, A Narrative of Some Remarkable Incidents in the Life of Solomon Bayley, Formerly a Slave in the State of Delaware, North America, 1825 
Mary Prince, The History of Mary Prince, a West Indian Slave, London, 1831
Charles Ball, Slavery in the United States: A Narrative of the Life and Adventures of Charles Ball, A Black Man, Lewistown, 1836
Moses Roper, A Narrative of Adventures and Escape of Moses Roper from American Slavery, London, 1837
Lunsford Lane, The Narrative of Lunsford Lane, Formerly of Raleigh, N.C. Embracing an Account of His Early Life, the Redemption by Purchase of Himself and Family from Slavery, and His Banishment from the Place of His Birth for the Crime of Wearing a Colored Skin, 1842
Frederick Douglass, Narrative of the Life of Frederick Douglass, an American Slave, Boston, 1845
Lewis and Milton Clarke, Narratives of the Sufferings of Lewis and Milton Clarke, Sons of a Soldier of the Revolution, During a Captivity of More Than Twenty Years Among the Slaveholders of Kentucky, One of the So-Called Christian States of North America. Boston, 1846
William Wells Brown, Narrative of William Wells Brown, a Fugitive Slave, Boston, 1847
Henry Box Brown, Narrative of the Life of Henry Box Brown, Boston, 1849
Josiah Henson, The Life of Josiah Henson, Formerly a Slave, Now an Inhabitant of Canada, as Narrated by Himself, Boston, 1849
Henry Bibb, Narrative of the Life and Adventures of Henry Bibb, an American Slave, New York, 1849
James W. C. Pennington, The Fugitive Blacksmith, or Events in the History of James W. C. Pennington, London, 1849
Henry Watson, Narrative of Henry Watson, A Fugitive Slave, Boston, 1848.
Solomon Northup, Twelve Years a Slave, Auburn, and Buffalo, New York, and London, 1853
John Brown, Slave Life in Georgia: A Narrative of the Life, Sufferings, and Escape of John Brown, a Fugitive Slave, Now in England, 1855
The Life of John Thompson, A Fugitive Slave, Worcester, Massachusetts, 1855
Kate E. R. Pickard, The Kidnapped and the Ransomed, Being the Personal Recollections of Peter Still and his Wife "Vina," after Forty Years of Slavery, New York, 1856
Jermain Wesley Loguen, The Rev. J. W. Loguen, as a Slave and as a Freeman, a Narrative of Real Life, 1859
Ellen and William Craft, Running a thousand Miles for Freedom, or the Escape of William and Ellen Craft from Slavery, London, 1860
Harriet Jacobs, Incidents in the Life of a Slave Girl, Boston, 1861
John Andrew Jackson, The Experience of a Slave in South Carolina, London, 1862
Jacob D. Green, Narrative of the Life of J. D. Green, a Runaway Slave from Kentucky,  Huddersfield, 1864
"Recollections of Slavery by a Runaway Slave", The Emancipator, August 23, September 13, September 20, October 11, October 18, 1838, http://docsouth.unc.edu/neh/runaway/menu.html, retrieved 09/15/2014

Tales of progress

Following the defeat of the slave states of the Confederate South, the authors had less need to convey the evils of slavery. Some gave a sentimental account of plantation life and ended with the narrator adjusting to the new life of freedom. The emphasis of writers shifted conceptually toward a recounting of individual and racial progress rather than securing freedom.

Examples include:
James Mars, The Life of James Mars, A Slave Born and Sold in Connecticut, Hartford, 1864
Paul Jennings, A Colored Man's Reminiscences of James Madison, 1865
William Parker, The Freedman's Story, published in The Atlantic Monthly, 1866
Elizabeth Keckley, Behind the Scenes: Or, Thirty Years a Slave and Four Years in the White House, 1868 
William Still, The Underground Railroad Records, 1872, recounts the experiences of hundreds of slaves
James Lindsay Smith, Autobiography of James L. Smith, 1881, published by the Norwich Bulletin
Lucy Delaney, From the Darkness Cometh the Light, or, Struggles for Freedom, 1892 — this is unique as the only first-person account of a successful freedom suit
Louis Hughes, Thirty Years a Slave: From Bondage to Freedom, Milwaukee, 1897
Booker T. Washington, Up From Slavery, Garden City, New York, 1901
Sam Aleckson, Before the War, and After the Union: An Autobiography, Boston, 1929

WPA slave narratives

During the Great Depression of the 1930s, the New Deal Works Projects Administration (WPA) employed writers and researchers from the Federal Writers' Project to interview and document the stories of African Americans who were former slaves. Most had been children when the Thirteenth Amendment was passed. Produced between 1936 and 1938, the narratives recount the experiences of more than 2,300 former slaves. Some interviews were recorded; 23 of 26 known audio recordings are held by the American Folklife Center of the Library of Congress. The last interview of a former slave was with Fountain Hughes, then 101, in Baltimore, Maryland, in 1949. He was a grandson of a slave owned by President Thomas Jefferson at Monticello.

North American slave narratives as travel literature 
Slave narratives inherently involved travel and form a significant type of travel writing. As John Cox says in Traveling South, "travel was a necessary prelude to the publication of a narrative by a slave, for slavery could not be simultaneously experienced and written." Where many travel narratives are written by privileged travelers, slave narratives show people traveling despite significant legal barriers to their actions, and in this way are a distinct and essential element in how travel narratives formed the American character.

North African slave narratives
In comparison to North American and Caribbean slave narratives, the North African slave narratives in English were written by British and American white slaves captured (often at sea or through Barbary pirates) and enslaved in North Africa in the 18th and early 19th centuries. These narratives have a distinct form in that they highlight the "otherness" of the Muslim slave traders, whereas the African-American slave narratives often call slave traders to account as fellow Christians.

Narratives focused on the central themes of freedom and liberty which drew inspiration from the American Revolution. Since the narratives include the recurrence of themes and events, quoting, and relying heavily upon each other it is believed by scholars that the main source of information was other narratives more so than real captivities. Female captives were depicted as Gothic fiction characters clinging to the hope of freedom thus more relatable to the audience.

Examples include:

A True and Faithful Account of the Religion and Manners of the Mahometans by Joseph Pitts (1663–1735) tells his capture as a boy age 14 or 15 by pirates while fishing off Newfoundland. His sale as a slave and his life under three different masters in North Africa, and his travels to Mecca are all described.
Tyrkja-Gudda, 1952 and 2001
Thomas Pellow, The History of the Long Captivity and Adventures of Thomas Pellow, In South Barbary, 1740
A Curious, Historical and Entertaining Narrative of the Captivity and almost unheard of Sufferings and Cruel treatment of Mr Robert White, 1790
A Journal of the Captivity and Suffering of John Foss; Several Years a Prisoner in Algiers, 1798
History of the Captivity and Sufferings of Mrs Maria Martin who was six years a slave in Algiers; two of which she was confined in a dismal dungeon, loaded with irons, by the command of an inhuman Turkish officer. Written by herself. To which is added, a concise history of Algiers, with the manners and customs of the people, 1812
Captain James Riley, Sufferings in Africa, 1815 
The Narrative of Robert Adams, An American Sailor who was wrecked on the West Coast of Africa in the year 1810; was detained Three Years in Slavery by the Arabs of the Great Desert, 1816
James Leander Cathcart, The Captives, Eleven Years a Prisoner in Algiers, published in 1899, many years after his captivity

Women's slave narratives 
Narratives by enslaved women include the memoirs of Harriet Jacobs, Mary Prince, Mattie J. Jackson, and "old Elizabeth," among others.

In her narrative, Mary Prince, a Bermuda-born woman and slave discusses her deep connection with her master's wife and the pity she felt for the wife as she witnessed the "ill-treatment" the wife suffered at the hands of her husband. Prince was taught to read by Moravian missionaries. Literacy, however, was not a common theme for all enslaved women. The life story of "old Elizabeth" was transcribed from her oral account at the age of 97.

Other historical slave narratives
As slavery has been practised all over the world for millennia, some narratives cover places and times other than these main two. One example is the account given by John R. Jewitt, an English armourer enslaved for years by Maquinna of the Nootka people in the Pacific Northwest. The Canadian Encyclopedia calls his memoir a "classic of captivity literature" and it is a rich source of information about the indigenous people of Vancouver Island.
Narrative of the Adventures and Sufferings of John R. Jewitt, only survivor of the crew of the ship Boston, during a captivity of nearly three years among the savages of Nootka Sound: with an account of the manners, mode of living, and religious opinions of the natives. Middletown, Connecticut, printed by Loomis and Richards, 1815

Maria ter Meetelen (1704 in Amsterdam – fl. 1751), was a Dutch writer of an autobiography. Her biography is considered to be a valuable witness statement of the life of a former slave (1748).
 Maria ter Meetelen, The Curious and Amazing Adventures of Maria ter Meetelen; Twelve Years a Slave (1731- 43), Translated and Introduced by Caroline Stone. (Hardinge Simpole, 2010) .

Contemporary slave narratives

Nonfiction
A contemporary slave narrative is a recent memoir written by a former slave, or ghost-written on their behalf. Modern areas of the world in which slavery occurs include the Sudan. Escape from Slavery: The True Story of My Ten Years in Captivity – and My Journey to Freedom in America (2003) by Francis Bok and Edward Tivnan, and Slave by Mende Nazer and Damien Lewis, describe from slavery experiences in the Sudan.

"Another Slave Narrative", a film series, was launched by filmmaker Michelle Jackson on December 18, 2016. Jackson, inspired by an interview with a former slave, decided to present the stories of previously enslaved people in a series of short films. A cast of 22 actors of mixed  sex, race, and age, read out individual slaves' interviews from the Slave Narrative Collection which includes more than 2,300 interviews conducted from 1936–38. Jackson's aim is to document every single fate and hence approach the taboo of slavery, and keep the memory of the slaves alive through these videos.

Fictional
The Underground Railroad by National Book Award winner Colson Whitehead takes place in an alternative version of the 19th century. Cora, a slave on a cotton farm in Georgia escapes via the Underground Railroad. The novel was well received. It was said to possess "the chilling, matter-of-fact power of the slave narratives collected by the Federal Writers' Project in the 1930s, with echoes of Toni Morrison's Beloved" and could be considered as a modern-tale fictional slave narrative.

Neo-slave narratives
A neo-slave narrative — a term coined by Ishmael Reed while working on his 1976 novel Flight to Canada and used by him in a 1984 interview — is a modern fictional work set in the slavery era by contemporary authors or substantially concerned with depicting the experience or the effects of enslavement in the New World. The works are largely classified as novels, but may pertain to poetical works as well. The renaissance of the postmodern slave narratives in the 20th century was a means to deal retrospectively with slavery, and to give a fictional account of historical facts from the first-person perspective.

Examples include:
Madison Smartt Bell, All Souls' Rising (1995), first of trilogy about the Haitian Revolution
David Bradley, The Chaneysville Incident (1981)
Octavia E. Butler, Kindred (1979)
Noni Carter, Good Fortune (2010), young adult novel
David Anthony Durham, Walk Through Darkness (2002)
Ernest J. Gaines, The Autobiography of Miss Jane Pittman (1971)
Alex Haley, Roots: The Saga of an American Family (1976)
Marie-Elena John, Unburnable (2006)
Edward P. Jones, The Known World (2003)
Toni Morrison, Beloved (1987)
William Styron, Confessions of Nat Turner (1967)
Natasha Trethewey, Native Guard (2006)
Margaret Walker, Jubilee (1966)
Sherley Anne Williams, Dessa Rose (1986)
Évelyne Trouillot, The Infamous Rosalie (2003)
Manu Herbstein, Ama: A Story of the Atlantic Slave Trade (2001)
Manu Herbstein, Brave Music of a Distant Drum (2011)
Colson Whitehead, The Underground Railroad (2016)

See also

Literature
African-American literature
Caribbean literature

Authors of slave narratives
William J. Anderson
Jared Maurice Arter
Lewis Charlton
Lucinda Davis
Moses Grandy
Lunsford Lane
J. Vance Lewis
Moses Roper
Wallace Turnage
John M. Washington

Other
Unchained Memories - HBO documentary with readings from slave narratives (2003)

References

External links
 "Born in Slavery: Slave Narratives from the Federal Writers' Project, 1936–1938", American Memory, Library of Congress.
 "North American Slave Narratives, Beginnings to 1920", Documenting the American South, University of North Carolina.
 "Slave Narratives: An Online Anthology" – WPA oral histories of former US slaves collected in the 1930s, American Studies, University of Virginia.
 eTexts – Oral histories of former US slaves collected in the 1930s by the Work Projects Administration hosted at  Project Gutenberg.
 University of South Florida Libraries: Florida Slave Narratives Narratives of African-Americans who spent their childhood and teenage years as slaves.

American literature
Cultural history of the United States
Oral history
African-American cultural history
Narrative
 
Narrative
Literary genres